This is a list of Russian football transfers in the winter transfer window 2009–10 by club. Only clubs of the 2010 Russian Premier League are included.

Alania Vladikavkaz 

In:
 

Out:

Amkar Perm 

In:
 

Out:

Anzhi Makhachkala 

In:

Out:

CSKA Moscow 

In:
 

Out:

Dynamo Moscow 

In:

Out:

Krylia Sovetov Samara 

In:

Out:

Lokomotiv Moscow 

In:
 

Out:

FC Rostov 

In:
 

Out:

Rubin Kazan 

In:

Out:

Saturn Moscow Oblast 

In:
 

Out:

Sibir Novosibirsk 

In:

Note: footballers transferred from Sibir-LFC (amateur level farm team) are not listed.

Out:

Spartak Moscow 

In:

Out:

Spartak Nalchik 

In:

Out:

Terek Grozny 

In:
 

Out:

Tom Tomsk 

In:
 

Out:

Zenit Saint Petersburg 

In:
 

Out:

References

Transfers
Transfers
2009-10
Russia